KDAL-FM (95.7 FM, "My 95.7") is an American radio station in Duluth, Minnesota airing an adult contemporary format.

KDAL-FM is owned by Midwest Communications, which also owns KDKE, WDSM, WDUL, KDAL, and KTCO in Duluth. All the Duluth stations share the same studio location at 11 East Superior St. Suite 380, downtown Duluth.

History

KDAL-FM previously carried an adult contemporary format under the names "96 Lite FM" and "Magic 95.7". KDAL-FM aired the syndicated Deliliah show weeknights.  Upon changing its name to "The Bridge" on January 1, 2006 it aired a variation of the adult hits format that was best described as a classic hits/adult album alternative (AAA) hybrid.  In 2008 the station began airing a full-fledged AAA format.

On September 13, 2010, KDAL-FM changed its format to classic rock, branded as "Rock 96" and focusing on rock music from the 1970s, 1980s, and 1990s. By the summer of 2011, "Rock 96" tweaked to a mainstream rock format playing a mix of classic rock and rock from the 1970s, 80s, 90s, 2000s, to current active rock music, competing between heritage classic rock 94.9 KQDS-FM and active rock 104.3/94.1 KZIO "94X".

On February 18, 2014, KDAL-FM changed its format to adult contemporary, branded as "FM 95.7". On September 21, 2015, KDAL-FM rebranded as "My 95.7".

References

External links
KDAL-FM official website

Radio stations in Duluth, Minnesota
Radio stations in Superior, Wisconsin
Mainstream adult contemporary radio stations in the United States
Radio stations established in 1985
1985 establishments in Minnesota
Midwest Communications radio stations